The role of sadism and masochism in fiction has attracted serious scholarly attention. Anthony Storr has commented that the volume of sadomasochist pornography shows that sadomasochistic interest is widespread in Western society; John Kucich has noted the importance of masochism in late-19th-century British colonial fiction. This article presents appearances of sadomasochism in literature and works of fiction in the various media.

Novels
Titles are sorted in chronological order.

Pre-19th century

Aloisiae Sigaeae, Toletanae, Satyra sotadica de arcanis Amoris et Veneris (1660) by Nicolas Chorier, translated into English as A Dialogue between a Married Woman and a Maid in various editions. depicts an older woman giving sexual instruction to a younger, recommending the spiritual and erotic benefits of a flogging.
Fanny Hill (1749) by John Cleland – depicts mutual flagellation, between Fanny and an English client.  The understanding of flagellation is in transition from an aphrodisiac practice intended to improve sexual performance to a sexual activity in its own right.
Fashionable Lectures: composed and delivered with Birch Discipline (ca 1750) on the theme of flagellation by dominant women in positions of authority.
The 120 Days of Sodom (1785), Justine (1791), Philosophy in the Bedroom (1795), and Juliette (1797) by the Marquis de Sade – Have an extreme, sadistic perspective. "The term sadism derives from the Marquis de Sade (1740-1814), a French nobleman imprisoned for his libertinism, and for writing fantastic novels, such as Justine [1797] and Juliette [1797] that equated sexual pleasure with the inflicting of pain, humiliation, and cruelty".
Anti-Justine (1798) by Nicolas-Edme Rétif – A response to the works of de Sade, written in a like style, describing the opposite political point of view.

19th century

The Lustful Turk, or Lascivious Scenes from a Harem (1828) by Anonymous. First published in England by John Benjamin Brookes, the book was not widely known until it was reprinted by William Dugdale in 1893. This tale of sex and sadism consists largely of a series of letters written by its heroine, Emily Barlow, after being abducted by Moorish pirates and held prisoner in an Algerian harem. The David F. Friedman sexploitation film The Lustful Turk (1968) is based on the novel.
Exhibition of Female Flagellants (1830) attributed, probably falsely, to Theresa Berkley, published by George Cannon. The principal activity described is flagellation, mainly of women by women, described in a theatrical, fetishistic style.  It was republished around 1872 by John Camden Hotten.
The New Ladies' Tickler, or Adventures of Lady Lovesport and the Audacious Harry (1866) by Edward Sellon – dealing with flagellation and lesbian incest
The Romance of Chastisement (1866) by St George Stock, a probable pseudonym, also credited with The Whippingham Papers (John Camden Hotten: London). A pornographic collection on the theme of flagellation.  Reprinted by Charles Carrington in 1902 as The Magnetism of the Rod or the Revelations of Miss Darcy.
Revelries! and Devilries!! (1867), anonymous, published by William Dugdale.  Said to be the collaboration of four Oxford scholars and an army officer.  The book is a linked collection of stories in which sadism is a theme.
Personal Recollections of the Use of the Rod (1868) by "Margaret Anson", pseudonym of British author James Glass Bertram (John Camden Hotten: York, date given as 1857).  As is common in this genre, the author/narrator is given as female, and the perpetrators and victims are mainly women.  Reprinted by Blue Moon Books in 2000; also published as The Merry Order of St. Bridget. Translated in French as Une société de flagellantes. Réminiscences et révélations d'une soubrette de grande maison (1901) by Jean de Villiot, illustrated by Martin van Maële.
 Flagellation & the Flagellants: A History of the Rod (1868) by "Rev. William Cooper", again James Glass Bertram, a best-seller for Hotten.
Memoiren einer Sängerin (1868). Translated to French as Les Memoirs d'une chanteuse allemande and to English as Pauline, the Prima Dona or Memoirs of an Opera Singer. Published anonymously but likely authored by Wilhelmine Schröder-Devrient. Originally published after her death in two installments in 1868 and 1875; reprinted often since.
Venus in Furs (1870) by Leopold von Sacher-Masoch – Autobiographical novel wherein the protagonist encourages his mistress to enslave and mistreat him. Many of Sacher-Masoch's other works contain themes of sadomasochism and female dominance of the male. The term 'Masochism' derives from von Sacher-Masoch's name.
The Romance of Lust (1873–6) published by William Lazenby includes flagellation by a governess among a variety of sexual activities, such as incest, orgies, masturbation, lesbianism, fellatio, cunnilingus, gay sex, anal sex, and double penetration.
The Convent School, or Early Experiences of A Young Flagellant (1876) by "Rosa Coote", pseudonym of the author and publisher, William Dugdale, in which a woman is whipped and tortured by two men.
Experimental Lecture (1878/9) by "Colonel Spanker", published by Charles Carrington, on sadistic flagellation.  The Colonel and his circle have a house in Park Lane where young ladies are kidnapped, humiliated, whipped and raped.
Miss Coote's Confession (1879–1880), an epistolary serial novella also supposedly by Rosa Coote in The Pearl, a pornographic magazine published by William Lazenby, deals with flagellation at home and at school.
In The Brothers Karamazov (1880), Fyodor Pavlovitch says,

The Mysteries of Verbena House, or, Miss Bellasis Birched for Thieving (1882) by "Etonensis" [pseud.], actually by George Augustus Sala and James Campbell Reddie (co-author of The Sins of the Cities of the Plain).
The Whippingham Papers (1888) with poetry ascribed to Algernon Charles Swinburne, edited by St. George H. Stock, a probable pseudonym, also credited with The Romance of Chastisement (1866).  A collection of Victorian stories and verse about erotic flagellation.
First Training (1890) also known as Clara Birch by anonymous recounts the sexual coming-of-age of a young English lady. Under the tutelage of her imperious stepmother, the voluptuous Clara learns how to make all around her cater to her every whim.
The Yellow Room (1891) by anonymous (generally attributed to "M. Le Comte Du Bouleau", aka Stanislas Matthew de Rhodes). – Novella about an eighteen-year-old girl educated and disciplined by her stern aunt and uncle. Reprinted along with the novella Letters to a Lady Friend, in Whipped into Shape: Two Classic Erotic Novellas by Renaissance E Books Inc. (2004).
 Gynecocracy:  A Narrative of the Adventures and Psychological Experiences of Julian Robinson, by "Viscount Ladywood" [pseud.] (1893), the author recounts his punishment as a boy at the hands of the governess to whom he is sent, along with three female cousins, after having taken indecent liberties with a household maid. Forced to wear girls' clothing as his ordinary attire, Julian, now Julia, is subjected to frequent flagellations, as are his cousins, one of whom he later marries, submitting to her dominance through continued forced feminization and crossdressing.
The Confessions of Georgina (1893) by Julian Robinson (aka Le Compte Du Bouleau, Stanislas Matthew de Rhodès) – a tale of bondage and domination that satirizes the hypocrisy of Victorian morality. Author of The Petticoat Dominant, or Woman's Revenge – The Autobiography of a Young Nobleman (1898), an early classic of male-submissive pinafore eroticism.
Raped on the Railway: a True Story of a Lady who was first ravished and then flagellated on the Scotch Express (1894), anonymous, by Charles Carrington  A married woman is raped by a stranger in a locked railway compartment and in a common trope in later Victorian pornography is depicted as ultimately taking pleasure in the act: she is then flagellated by her brother-in-law for the latter transgression. The plot may have been inspired by the real-life case of Colonel Valentine Baker, who was convicted of an indecent assault on a young woman in a railway carriage in 1875. An American adaptation, or plagiarism, was published in New York City under the title Raped on the Elevated Railway, a True Story of a Lady who was First Ravished and then Flagellated on the Uptown Express, illustrating the Perils of Travel in the New Machine Age set in New York.
A Full and True Account of the Wonderful Mission of Earl Lavender (1895) by John Davidson (London: Ward & Downey). A burlesque on the Decadent movement with private whipping clubs and other flagellatory adventures from noted poet, playwright, and humorist John Davidson.
Tales of Fun and Flagellation (1896) by Lady Gay Spanker [pseud.]. A diverse collection of anecdotes and stories.
The Torture Garden (1899) by Octave Mirbeau An allegorical examination of Western society, and of the human condition.
The Memoirs of Dolly Morton: The Story of A Woman's Part in the Struggle to Free the Slaves, An Account of the Whippings, Rapes, and Violences that Preceded the Civil War in America, with Curious Anthropological Observations on the Radical Diversities in the Conformation of the Female Bottom and the Way Different Women Endure Chastisement (1899) under the pseudonym Jean de Villiot, probably Hugues Rebell or Charles Carrington.  Edited and published in London and Paris by Charles Carrington. Another edition was published in Philadelphia in 1904.
Lashed into Lust: The Caprice of a Flagellator (1899) by Anonymous. – French novel reprinted in 1908 with "James Lovebirch" as author. Reprinted in 2000 by Blue Moon Books (New York).

20th century

"Frank" and I (1902) by Anonymous. Originally published in three volumes in England. Edwardian novel of flagellation pornography. A wealthy young man, who is "a lover of the rod", takes in "Frank", a teenage girl disguised as a boy. A 1983 film was released under the alternative titles Frank and I and Lady Libertine.
Vanessa, The Vicar's Girl (1903) by Anonymous. Reverend Jubstone delights in bending the Markham household to his lascivious will through the vigorous application of the Scottish tawse.
Maud Cameron and her Guardian (1903) written anonymously, though some attribute it to the pseudonymous Charles Sackville, privately printed for subscribers only (Golden Birch House: London). Author of numerous flagellation novels published in London and Paris including: Two Lascivious Adventures of Mr. Howard – A continuation of Maud Cameron and her Guardian (1907), The Amazing Chastisements of Miss Bostock (1908), Three Chapters in the Life of Mr. Howard (1908), Whipping as a Fine Art – Being an Account of Exquisite and Refined Chastisement Inflicted by Mr. Howard on Grown-up Schoolgirls (1909), et al.
Woman and Her Master (1904) by Jean de Villiot, pseudonym of Georges Grassal – a novel of flagellation erotica translated into English by Charles Carrington from the original 1902 French edition, La Femme et son maître.
Birch in the Boudoir (1905) by anonymous (attributed to Hugues Rebell, real name Georges Grassal), translated and published in Paris by Charles Carrington. Reprinted in 1989 by Blue Moon Books as Beauty in the Birch. – An exchange of racy letters about the amatory and disciplinary experiences of a new master of an English school for wayward girls and a woman living in an Arabian harem.
The Mistress and The Slave (1905) by George Merder – a study of female domination and sadomasochism as an upper-class businessman is enslaved and brutalized by a Parisian street-girl. Translated from the original French edition, La Maitresse et l'Esclave (Maison Mystere, ca. 1903).
La Flagellation Passionnelle (1906) by Don Brennus Aléra, pseudonym of Paul Guérard. Between 1903 and 1936 he wrote and illustrated around 100 historical and contemporary novels about flagellation and crossdressing petticoat punishment.
Les Onze Mille Verges (The eleven thousand rods) by Guillaume Apollinaire – written in the 1906–1907 period; the publication is unsigned and undated. Picasso thought this was the finest book he had ever read.
Sadopaideia: Being the Experiences of Cecil Prendergast Undergraduate of the University of Oxford Shewing How he was Led Through the Pleasant Paths of Masochism to the Supreme joys of Sadism. (1907) by anonymous. – Two-volume tale of a man who experiences both dominance and submission. Anthony Storr attributes it to Algernon Charles Swinburne.
The Beautiful Flagellants of New York (1907) by Lord Drialys (The Society of British Bibliophiles [Charles Carrington]: Paris) – follows an intrepid traveller's adventures from Chicago to Boston to New York. Originally published in three volumes, one for each city.	Reprinted by Olympia Press as The Beautiful Flagellants of Chicago, Boston and New York.
Nos Belles flagellantes (1907) by Aimé Van Rod (Édition Parisienne: Paris). French author of dozens of flagellation novels including: Nouveax Contes de Fouet (1907), The Conjugal Whip (Le fouet conjugal) (1908), Le Fouet dominateur ou L'École des vierges, Les Mystéres du Fouet (both 1909), The Humiliations of Miss Madge (1912), Les Malheurs de Colette (1914), Visites fantastiques au pays du fouet (1922), Le Precepteur (1923), Memories d'une Fouettee (1924), et al.
The Way of a Man with a Maid (ca. 1908) by Anonymous. First published in France, exact date and author unknown. Three-volume Edwardian novel of abduction, sex and sadism. Often reprinted as a single volume under the shorter title A Man with a Maid. Adapted to film in 1975 called What the Swedish Butler Saw.
La Comtesse au fouet (1908), by Pierre Dumarchey (Pierre Mac Orlan) – the story of a cruel dominatrix who turns the male hero into a "dog-man". Under the pen-name Miss Sadie Blackeyes, he wrote popular flagellation novels such as Baby douce fille (1910), Miss: The memoirs of a young lady of quality containing recollections of boarding school discipline and intimate details of her chastisement (1912), and Petite Dactylo et autres textes de flagellation (1913). And as "Anonymous" wrote Masochists in America (Le Masochisme en Amérique: Recueil des récits et impressions personnelles d'une victime du féminisme) (1905).
Éducation Anglaise (1908) by Lord Kidrodstock (Édition Parisienne: Paris) – early and unusual text featuring forced cross-dressing and flagellation. Boys and girls in an English boarding school are dressed alike in girls' clothes. They receive training by means of the discipline of tight corsets, narrow high-heeled boots, etc., reinforced by frequent application of the whip or the birch. Illustrated with ten drawings by Del Giglio.
Coups de Fouet (1908) by Lord Birchisgood [pseud.] (Édition Parisienne, Roberts & Dardailons Éditeurs: Paris). Author of Le Tour d'Europe d'un flagellant (1909), et al.
Les Cinq fessées de Suzette (Five Smackings of Suzette) (1910) by James Lovebirch [pseud.], published in Paris. Author of many popular flagellation novels such as L'Avatar de Lucette (The Misadventures of Lucette), Peggy Briggs, Au Bon Vieux Temps (all from 1913), and The Flagellations of Suzette (1915), Paris: Library Aristique.
Qui Aime Bien (1912) by Jacques d'Icy, pseudonym of author and artist Louis Malteste (Jean Fort: Paris), illustrated by Malteste. Writer of many books of spanking/whipping erotica such as: Chatie Bien (1913), Monsieur Paulette et Ses Epouses (1921), Paulette Trahie (1922), Brassée de faits (1925), Les Mains Chéries (1927), et al.
Le règne de la cravache et de la bottine (The Reign of the Riding Crop and the Boot) (1913) by Roland Brévannes, pseudonym of Paul Guérard (Select Bibliothèque: Paris) – humiliating animal roleplay, female-dominated men are forced to crawl about in bear suits. A theme explored in several of his books; in Les Esclaves-montures (Slave Mountings) (1920) and Le Club des Monteurs Humaines (1924), men are turned into obedient cart ponies.
Fred: The True History of a Boy Raised as a Girl (1913) by Don Brennus Alera, pseudonym of Paul Guérard – classic story of humiliating petticoat punishment (Pinafore eroticism). Followed by the sequels Frederique (1921), Frida (1924), Fridoline (1926), and Lina Frido (1927).
Récits Piquants, chaudes aventures: scènes de féminisme. (1914) by Gilbert Natès, illustrated by G. Topfer. French compilation of various episodes of whipping. The punishers are all women, the victims boys and girls, young men and women. In several cases the male victims are forced to wear female clothing.
Ulysses (1918–1920; 1922) by James Joyce employs themes of masochism, especially in the "Circe" section which has multiple allusions to Venus in Furs.
Two Flappers in Paris (1920) by "A. Cantab" [pseud.] – two young women visiting Paris are lured into a flagellatory brothel.
Esclaves Modernes (Modern Slaves) (1922) by Jean de Virgans, illustrated by Gaston Smit – unusual tale of power exchange (BDSM) with white European women whipped and abused by African natives. Virgans also wrote Flagellees in 1909.
The Metamorphosis of Lisette Joyaux (1924) by Anonymous; a tale of the education of young Lisette indoctrinated into the pleasures of lesbianism and chastisement by five Sapphists who employ rope, cane, and birch. Written and published in English, the novel is set in France, and often printed alongside The Story of Monique (1924) again anonymously written, which explores an underground society's clandestine rituals and scandalous encounters that reveals the sexual rituals that beckon the ripe and willing Monique.
Histoire de l'oeil (Story of the Eye) (1928) by Georges Bataille – A short novel.
Le Dressage de la Maid-Esclave (1930) by Bernard Valonnes, pseudonym of Paul Guérard (Select Bibliothèque: Paris) – two-volume story of women trained as cart-pulling ponygirl slaves.
The Discipline of Odette (1930) by Jean Martinet [pseud.] (Éditions Prima); English translation of the French whipping/spanking novel Matée par le fouet.
The Erotic Picture of Dorian Gray (1929) 2 volumes by Anonymous; translation by Alfred Richard Allinson of the German novel Das Bildnis des Dorian Gray
Bagne de femmes (Jail for Girls) (1931) by Alan Mac Clyde [pseud.], Librairie Générale: Paris. One of the earliest of dozens of sadomasochistic novels by this unknown author. Followed by Dressage (1931), La Cité de l'horreur (1933), Servitude (1934), Dolly, Esclave (1936), et al.
Dresseuses d'hommes (1931) by Florence Fulbert (Jean Fort: Paris), illustrated by Jim Black [Luc Lafnet]. Story of men dominated and punished by women.
Sous la tutelle (Under Supervision) (1932) by René-Michel Desergy (Jean Fort: Paris), illustrated by Luc Lafnet – story of spanking, whipping and enema punishment. Author of numerous spanking and flagellation novels such as Trente Ans (1928), Severe Education (1931), Diana Gantee (1932), and Chambrieres De Haute Ecole (1934).
Memoirs of a Dominatrice (1933) by Jean Claqueret (Jean Fort: Paris). French author of many whipping/spanking novels: Clotilde et Quelques Autres (1935), Humiliations chéries (1936), Pantalons sans défense (1938), et al.
La Volupté du Fouet (The Pleasure of the Whip) (1938) by Armand du Loup, illustrated by famous French artist Étienne Le Rallic under the alias R. Fanny.
Story of O (1954) by Pauline Réage – To prove her love, the protagonist submits to being kept in a château and abused by a group of men, one her official lover. Later, she resumes her normal life, while secretly becoming the property of a friend of her lover's. It was made into a film in 1975.
The Whip Angels (1955) by XXX or Selena Warfield, pseudonyms of Diane Bataille, second wife of French writer Georges Bataille (The Olympia Press: Paris) – a pastiche of a Victorian erotic novel.
L'Image (1956) by Jean de Berg (pseudonym of Catherine Robbe-Grillet). In 1975, it was made into a film, The Image, also titled as The Punishment of Anne.
The Passionate Lash or The Revenge of Sir Hilary Garner (c. 1957) by Alan McClyde [pseud.] (Pall Mall Press: Paris) – Alan Mac Clyde was a popular house name used for English-language erotic books from the 1950s onward
The Ordeal of the Rod (1958) by Bernard R. Burns [pseud]. (Ophelia Press: Paris).
The English Governess (Ophelia Press, 1960), revised as Harriet Marwood, Governess (1967) by John Glassco under the pseudonym, "Miles Underwood".
Gordon (1966) by Edith Templeton – once-banned novel about a woman in postwar London who falls into an intense submissive relationship with a psychiatrist.
The Master Spanker (1966) by Edward Landon (Unique Books), Venus In Bondage (1969) by Lurene Jones (N. P. Inc.), and Margo Lee: Diary of a Teenage Sado-Masochist (1969) by Red Young (Classic Publications: Los Angeles) are representative examples of the hundreds of S&M pulp novels produced in the U.S. in the 1960s by Corinth Publications, Taurus Press, Black Cat Books, Gargoyle Press, et al.
Tarnsman of Gor (1967) by John Norman – first in a series of 35 (as of this date) erotic science fiction novels set on the planet Gor. The novels describe an elaborate culture of sexual master/slave relationships which have spawned a BDSM lifestyle subculture of followers who call themselves Goreans.
Je... Ils... (1969) by Arthur Adamov – With stories like Fin Août. About Masochism, regarded as an "immunisation against death", but does not aim at erotic arousal.
Hogg (1969) by Samuel Delany.
The Marquesa de Sade: Erotic Mistress of Exquisite Evil (1970) by Joseph LeBaron [pseud.] (Hanover House: North Hollywood) – adapted from the film produced by Jaybird Enterprises.
Gravity's Rainbow (1973) by Thomas Pynchon.
Memoirs of a Slave (1976) by Rene Michel Desergy (Janus Publications: London) – a typical example of the many books and magazines fetish publisher Janus produced in the 1970s.
Pagan Sex Orgy (1976) by Randy Palmer (Eros Publishing Co., Inc.: Wilmington, Delaware) – reflects the 1970s revival of occultism in books and film. Cover and illustrations by Bill Ward.
9½ Weeks (1978) an erotic memoir by Elizabeth McNeill, later made into the film 9½ Weeks starring Kim Basinger and Mickey Rourke in 1986.
Spanking the Maid (1982) by Robert Coover
The Correct Sadist (1983) by Terence Sellers (Grove Press: New York City) – reverses the dominant-submissive roles of The Story of O to create a post-feminist American myth about power.
Die Klavierspielerin (Reinbeck, 1983) by Elfriede Jelinek, made into the film The Piano Teacher by director Michael Haneke.
Anne Rice's sadomasochistic writing includes: Exit to Eden (1985), Belinda (1986), and The Claiming of Sleeping Beauty (1983) and its sequels, Beauty's Punishment (1984) and Beauty's Release (1985). The Sleeping Beauty books she wrote as A.N. Roquelaure.
The Hellbound Heart (1986), by popular horror writer Clive Barker, is a gruesome study of sadomasochism featuring brutal rituals by demonic entities.
 Ironwood (1988) by Don Winslow is the first in a series (Blue Moon Books, New York). A modern pastiche of Victorian novels such as Birch in the Boudoir about a young man who becomes master of a strict English school for girls. Followed by Images of Ironwood, Ironwood Revisited, Master of Ironwood, The Many Pleasures of Ironwood, et al.
Macho Sluts (1988) by Pat Califia
Something Leather (1990) by Alasdair Gray has as its framing story an initiation into sadomasochistic activities by the female operators of a leather clothing shop in Glasgow.
American Psycho (Vintage, 1991) by Bret Easton Ellis.
The Wet Forever (1991) by David Aaron Clark, about the sadomasochistic relationship between a grifter named Janus and a dominatrix named Madchen.
The Ties that Bind (Le Lien) (1993) by Vanessa Duriès.
Matriarchy: Freedom in Bondage, 1997 by Malcolm McKesson (An Outsider artist) – A boy undergraduate student in Harvard college is dominated by his mistress, and forced to dress as a woman.
Killing Me Softly (1999) by Nicci French. Made into a film of the same name in 2002 starring Heather Graham

21st century

Mark Ramsden's three novels The Dark Magus and the Sacred Whore, The Dungeonmaster's Apprentice (Serpent's Tail, both 1999) and The Sacred Blood (Serpent's Tail, 2001) are a darkly comic series of thrillers about the occult, fetishism and the BDSM scene.
The Marketplace (2000–2001), a series of novels by Laura Antoniou.
Kushiel's Dart (2001) by Jacqueline Carey – A dual-genre work, belonging to fantasy fiction and BDSM fiction, along with its sequels.
Role Plays (2003) by Andrei Gusev –  a collection of BDSM stories and short stories. Themes include female domination, bondage, erotic spanking and BDSM  fiction.
The Girl with the Dragon Tattoo (2005) by Stieg Larsson is a popular mystery-thriller that features scenes of sadism, sodomy, and torture. The two films adapted from it, by Niels Arden Oplav and David Fincher also depicted scenes that made the book controversial.
 Fifty Shades of Grey (2011) by E. L. James begins a best-selling trilogy of novels followed by the sequels Fifty Shades Darker (2011), and Fifty Shades Freed (2012). There are also films based on the novels. However, the novels and films have been criticized for their inaccurate and harmful depiction of BDSM.
Never the Face (2011) by Ariel Sands, an account of a dominant-submissive relationship that descends into abuse between a man and a woman named only as "Kitten" or "Bitch".

Mainstream films

The following films feature BDSM as a major plot point.

Dramas:
 The Whip and the Body (La Frusta e il Corpo) (1963), directed by Mario Bava and starring Christopher Lee and Daliah Lavi
 The Embryo Hunts In Secret (1966), Japanese film directed by Kōji Wakamatsu
 Belle de jour (1967), directed by Luis Buñuel and starring Catherine Deneuve
 De Sade (1969), directed by Cy Endfield and starring Keir Dullea and Senta Berger
 Venus in Furs (1969), directed by Massimo Dallamano and starring Laura Antonelli and Régis Vallée
 Marquis de Sade: Justine (1969), directed by Jess Franco
 The Libertine (La Matriarca) (1968)
 Eugenie… The Story of Her Journey into Perversion (1970), directed by Jess Franco
 The Laughing Woman, aka Femina Ridens, The Frightened Woman (1969), directed by Piero Schivazappa
 Eugenie de Sade (1970), another Jesus Franco adaptation of de Sade
 Daughters of Darkness, (Le Rouge aux Lèvres) (1971), directed by Harry Kümel and starring Delphine Seyrig and John Karlen
 The Nightcomers (1971), directed by Michael Winner and starring Marlon Brando and Stephanie Beacham
 Last Tango in Paris (1972), directed by Bernardo Bertolucci and starring Marlon Brando and Maria Schneider
 Justine de Sade (1972), directed by Claude Pierson
 The Bitter Tears of Petra von Kant (Die bitteren Tränen der Petra von Kant) (1972) directed by Rainer Werner Fassbinder
 The Punishment (La punition) (1973) directed by Pierre-Alain Jolivet
 Flower and Snake (花と蛇 - Hana to Hebi) (1974), directed by Masaru Konuma and starring Naomi Tani
 The Night Porter, (Il Portiere di notte) (1974), directed by Liliana Cavani and starring Dirk Bogarde and Charlotte Rampling
 School of the Holy Beast (1974), nunsploitation classic starring Yumi Takigawa
 Wife to Be Sacrificed (生贄夫人 - Ikenie Fujin) (1974), directed by Masaru Konuma and starring Naomi Tani
 Story of O (Histoire d'O) (1975), directed by Just Jaeckin and starring Corinne Cléry
 The Image (The Punishment of Anne) (1975), directed by Radley Metzger
 Salò, or the 120 Days of Sodom (Salò o le 120 giornate di Sodoma) (1975), directed by Pier Paolo Pasolini
 In the Realm of the Senses (1976), directed by Nagisa Oshima
 Maîtresse (1976), directed by Barbet Schroeder starring Gérard Depardieu and Bulle Ogier
 Blood Sucking Freaks (The Incredible Torture Show) (1976)
 Sadomania (1981), directed by Jess Franco
 Lady Libertine (Frank and I) (1983), directed by Gérard Kikoïne and starring Sophie Favier
 A Woman in Flames (Die Flambierte Frau) (1983)
 Crimes of Passion (1984), directed by Ken Russell and starring Kathleen Turner and Anthony Perkins
 Seduction: The Cruel Woman (Verführung: Die grausame Frau) (1985)
 Blue Velvet (1986), written and directed by David Lynch and starring Kyle MacLachlan, Isabella Rossellini, Dennis Hopper and Laura Dern
 9½ Weeks (1986), directed by Adrian Lyne and starring Kim Basinger and Mickey Rourke
 S&M Hunter (1986)
 Tras el cristal (1986)
 Marquis de Sade's Prosperities of Vice (1988), Japanese "pink" film by Akio Jissoji
 Life Is Sweet (1990), directed by Mike Leigh
 Singapore Sling (1990), directed by Nikos Nikolaidis 
 Tie Me Up! Tie Me Down! (1990), directed by Pedro Almodóvar and starring Antonio Banderas and Victoria Abril
 Tokyo Decadence (Topazu) (1991), directed by Ryu Murakami and starring Miho Nikaido
 Bitter Moon (1992), directed by Roman Polanski and starring Hugh Grant, Kristin Scott Thomas, Emmanuelle Seigner, and Peter Coyote
 Spanking Love (1994)
 Venus in Furs (1994)
 Breaking the Waves by Lars von Trier (1996)
 Conspirators of Pleasure (1996), directed by Jan Švankmajer
 The Bondage Master (1996), a Japanese indie film directed by Keisuke Konishi
 Dark Prince (1996) (starring Nick Mancuso as the Marquis de Sade)
 Dark Secrets (1997)
 Of Freaks and Men (Pro urodov i lyudej) (1998)
 Lies (Gojitmal) (1999)
 Moonlight Whispers (Sasayaki) (1999)
 Romance (Romance X) (1999), directed by Catherine Breillat and starring Caroline Ducey and Rocco Siffredi
 Quills (2000), directed by Philip Kaufman and starring Geoffrey Rush, Kate Winslet, Joaquin Phoenix and Michael Caine
 The Piano Teacher (La Pianiste) (2001), directed by Michael Haneke and starring Isabelle Huppert and Benoît Magimel
 Secretary (2002), directed by Steven Shainberg and starring James Spader and Maggie Gyllenhaal
 Bettie Page: Dark Angel (2004), a biopic starring Paige Richards
 The Dominatrix (2004), British drama on the life of a career dominatrix
 Going Under (2004)
 The Passion of Life (2005)
 A Year Without Love (Un año sin amor) (2005), directed by Anahi Berneri
 The Zero Years (2005), directed by Nikos Nikolaidis
 The Notorious Bettie Page (2006), a biopic directed by Mary Harron and starring Gretchen Mol in the title role
 Hounded (Verfolgt) (2007), directed by Angelina Maccarone
 The Pet (2006), a woman (Andrea Edmondson) agrees to live like a pet dog for her master (Pierre Du Lat)
 New Tokyo Decadence – The Slave (2007), directed by Osamu Satō and starring Rinako Hirasawa and Kikujiro Honda
 SM-rechter (2009), Belgian drama based on a real life case
 Antichrist (2009), directed by Lars von Trier
 Pimp (2010), British thriller with Robert Cavanah as a Soho pimp
 Leap Year (Año bisiesto) (2010), Mexican drama directed by Michael Rowe
 A Dangerous Method (2011), directed by David Cronenberg, starring Keira Knightley, Viggo Mortensen and Michael Fassbender
 Nymphomaniac, Volume II (2013), directed by Lars von Trier
 Venus in Fur (La Vénus à la fourrure) (2013), directed by Roman Polanski, is based upon the 2011 two-person play, Venus in Fur, by David Ives
 The Duke of Burgundy (2014), directed by Peter Strickland
 Fifty Shades of Grey (2015), directed by Sam Taylor-Johnson
Professor Marston and the Wonder Women (2017), biopic of Wonder Woman creator William Moulton Marston
 Dogs Don't Wear Pants (2019), directed by J-P Valkeapää, starring Pekka Strang and Krista Kosonen

Comedy:
 The Choirboys (1977), directed by Robert Aldrich
 Eating Raoul (1982), directed by Paul Bartel and starring Mary Woronov
 Personal Services (1987), directed by Terry Jones and starring Julie Walters
 Exit to Eden (1994), directed by Garry Marshall and starring Rosie O'Donnell and Dan Aykroyd
 Preaching to the Perverted (1997), directed by Stuart Urban and starring Guinevere Turner and Christien Anholt
 Tomcats (2001)
 EuroTrip (2004) Lucy Lawless plays dominatrix Madame Vadersexxx in a segment of the movie.
 Walk All Over Me (2007), starring Tricia Helfer as a dominatrix and Leelee Sobieski
 Modern Love is Automatic (2009), bored nurse moonlights as a dominatrix

Thrillers/Horrors:
 Videodrome (1983), written and directed by David Cronenberg and starring James Woods and Deborah Harry
 Tightrope (1984), directed by Richard Tuggle and starring Clint Eastwood and Geneviève Bujold
 Hellraiser (1987), an American horror film written and directed by Clive Barker, starring Andrew Robinson and Clare Higgins
 Basic Instinct (1992), directed by Paul Verhoeven and starring Michael Douglas and Sharon Stone
 Body of Evidence (1993), directed by Uli Edel and starring Madonna and Willem Dafoe
 Strangeland (1998), Directed by John Pieplow, written by and starring musician Dee Snider of Twisted Sister
 8 mm (1999), directed by Joel Schumacher and starring Nicolas Cage and Joaquin Phoenix
 The Cell (2000), directed by Tarsem Singh
 Ichi the Killer (2001), directed by Takashi Miike
 Killing Me Softly (2002), directed by Chen Kaige

Television

Full Exposure: The Sex Tapes Scandal (1989), made-for-TV film. Police investigate underground S&M clubs looking for a serial killer. Vanessa Williams plays a hooker/dominatrix who videotapes her clients.
Mercy (film) (2000) HBO cable-television movie starring Ellen Barkin and Peta Wilson. Murder mystery leads to a secret S&M society.
Jack of All Trades is a comedy-adventure series set in the 19th century starring Bruce Campbell.  In the episode "X Marquis the Spot" (2000), Jack visits the island resort of the Marquis de Sade and competes in an S&M-themed obstacle course race that parodies Survivor.
Doc Martin, British television comedy-drama series starring Martin Clunes. In the episode "Old Dogs" (2005), the title character is consulted by a man who seems to have a habit of inexplicably injuring himself; it is later revealed that the man and his wife engage in BDSM, with the husband as the submissive.
Secret Diary of a Call Girl (2007); in the fourth episode, "Belle" (Billie Piper) takes BDSM lessons from a professional dominatrix as a favor for her accountant who is a closet submissive.
 Dollhouse (2009); the beginning of the 9th episode shows Echo (Eliza Dushku), returning from an assignment as a leather-clad whip-wielding dominatrix.
 On the Alias (2003) 2nd-season episode "Second Double", Agent Bristow (Jennifer Garner) goes undercover as a German dominatrix in a Berlin leather bar.
The FOX series The Inside episode "Old Wounds" dealt exclusively with S&M, and was criticized by the Parents Television Council as a result.
The television series CSI: Crime Scene Investigation has featured Melinda Clarke as professional dominatrix Lady Heather in six episodes, most notably in the 90-minute special episode "Lady Heather's Box". 
Season 4 of HBO series Six Feet Under features a character (Joe) who wants to adopt a submissive sexual role in his relationship with Brenda.
A Family Guy gag (from the episode "Let's Go to the Hop") depicts main characters Lois and Peter suiting up for a sadomasochistic session while having a mundane conversation about how wholesome their children are, and why they can be trusted. Toys have been made of this scene.  In the audio commentary for that episode it is noted that such a practice seemed normal to them.
Season 1 of the FOX medical drama House, episode "Love Hurts" a patient is deeply involved in a BDSM relationship.
 Rex Van de Kamp of Desperate Housewives was unveiled as a lover of S&M, much to the disgust of his wife, Bree.  In Come Back to Me, Sharon Lawrence plays Maisy Gibbons, a dominatrix who walks across Rex's back in stiletto heels.
 Season 2 of NBC's Friday night drama Homicide: Life on the Street, in the episode "A Many Splendored Thing". Detectives Bayliss and Pembleton investigate a murder in the S&M club scene. Bayliss expresses his disgust at the 'perversion', but the episode ends with his return to a leather shop, where he purchases a studded and belted leather jacket. This episode is the beginning of the character's sexual awakening, as he becomes comfortable with his bisexual feelings.
 ER – a professional dominatrix with broken fingers and her male slave, who was injured in a fall during a bondage/suspension session, are admitted to the emergency room.
 Private Practice – in the 2nd season, cast member KaDee Strickland is seen roleplaying as a German dominatrix with a latex outfit, studded collar, and a whip.
 Season 5 of FX's Nip/Tuck has Sean crossing paths with a Hollywood agent (Craig Bierko) with horrific wounds on his chest and the dominatrix (Tia Carrere) who inflicted them on him in the episode "Carly Summers".
 Rescue Me (2009) – In "Initiation" (Season 5, episode 15), Callie Thorne's character seduces Tommy (Denis Leary) dressed as a cheerleader, Playboy bunny and latex-clad dominatrix. They are briefly seen paddling each other in a fast-motion sequence.
 Castle, "The Mistress Always Spanks Twice" (ABC, season 2, episode 16, 2010): a murder investigation leads to the underground world of the professional dominatrix.
 HBO's series, The Sopranos, features multiple characters who engage in sadomasochism.
 In The Sopranos episode, "Mergers and Acquisitions", Valentina La Paz reports, in disgust, to Tony Soprano that in lieu of having conventional sexual relations, Soprano family mob captain, Ralph Cifaretto, asks her to scrape a cheese grater across his back and pour hot candle wax on his testicles.
 In The Sopranos episode "The Knight in White Satin Armor" (2000), Janice Soprano tells her sister-in-law, Carmela, that Janice allows Richie Aprile to hold a gun to Janice's head when they have sex.
 In the anime and manga Gin Tama, characters Sogo Okita and Sarutobi Ayame often practice sadism and masochism respectively.
 In the manga Nana to Kaoru by Amazume Ryuta, the protagonista Nana and Kaoru are shown to be in an SM relationship to help Nana with her "breathers". It also depicts different cultural practices related to SM. The manga has been adapted to into OVAs and live-action television movies.
 Kakegurui – Compulsive Gambler, features Midari Ikishima, a crazed and mentally unstable student with sadistic, masochistic and suicidal tendencies.
 Konosuba features Darkness, a masochistic crusader who dreams of being ravaged by monsters as well and marrying an abusive alcoholic husband. Ironically, she hates being called by her first name.
 American Horror Story: Asylum – FX network series about an insane asylum in 1964 run by a sadistic nun, Sister Jude (Jessica Lange). In "Welcome to Briarcliff" (episode 2:1, 2012) and "Tricks and Treats" (2:2) she canes a male patient. In "Unholy Night" (2:8), a deranged male patient gets revenge for being beaten (seen in brief flashback) by caning Sister Jude.
 Holby City episode 356 (#41 of Series 9, (2007)) involves a man being admitted to hospital with a stiletto heel in his chest. His Dominatrix, who accompanies him to hospital, has been trampling him, and penetrated his ribs.Stage

Thomas Shadwell's play The Virtuoso (1676) includes an old libertine named Snarl who entreats a prostitute, Mrs Figgup, to bring out the birch rods. It is unclear if he is to flog her or be flogged.
 Sodom, or the Quintessence of Debauchery (1684), an obscene Restoration closet drama thought to be by John Wilmot, 2nd Earl of Rochester.
In Thomas Otway's play Venice Preserv'd (1682), Act III, Scene i, an old senator, Antonio, visits the house of Aquilina, a Greek courtesan. Antonio pretends to be a bull, then a frog, begging her to spit on him, and then a dog, biting her legs. She whips him, then throws him out and tells her footmen to keep him out.
 Jean Genet's play The Maids (1947) concerns two maids who play out dominant and submissive roles.
 Genet's play The Balcony (1957) is set in a brothel where clients and staff perform various fetishized roles while a revolution brews outside.
 Venus in Fur (2011) is a two-person play by David Ives set in modern New York City.

PoetryThe Rodiad (1871), a pornographic poem on the subject of flagellation, falsely attributed to George Colman the Younger: probably by Richard Monckton Milnes, 1st Baron Houghton.
Algernon Charles Swinburne wrote poetry on erotic flagellation, some of which was published anonymously in The Whippingham Papers (ca. 1888).Squire Hardman (1967) by John Glassco, purporting to be a reprint of an 18th-century poem by George Colman the Younger, is a long poem in heroic couplets on the theme of flagellation.

Music
"The Masochism Tango" (1959) by Tom Lehrer uses the powerful rhythm of tango music and iconic implements like castanets and roses to comedic effect.
"Venus in Furs" (1966) by The Velvet Underground takes its title and subject matter from the 1870 novella of the same name by Leopold von Sacher-Masoch.  It is quite possibly the first pop song to detail an S&M encounter and relationship in explicit, unequivocal terms.
"Little Toy Soldier" (1967) by David Bowie is an early, unreleased track which recites lyrics from the Velvet Underground's "Venus in Furs" as part of its chorus; although the song's humorous treatment of S&M owes more to the cockeyed psychedelia of Syd Barrett.
"I Wanna Be Your Dog" (1969), "Dirt" (1970) and "Gimme Danger" (1973) by The Stooges all clearly indicate powerful masochistic tendencies and behavior on the part of the singer, Iggy Pop.
"Submission" (1976) by The Sex Pistols is a song which uses wordplay ("submission" as short for "submarine mission") to convey the ambiguities of an obsessive S&M relationship, albeit obliquely.
"Whips & Furs" and "I Need a Slave" (both 1977) by The Vibrators are two classic London punk-era songs which address the topic of recreational S&M.
"Bobby Brown" from 1979's Sheik Yerbouti by Frank Zappa is a narrative of a man who transforms from a misogynist teenager to a BDSM-practicing homosexual disc jockey after an unpleasant encounter from Freddie, a woman's rights activist.
"Whip in My Valise" (1979) by Adam and the Ants expresses a fascination with S&M play in fairly explicit terms; many of Adam Ant's other early songs of the 1970s, such as "Rubber People", "B-Side Baby", "Ligotage" and "Beat My Guest", also describe similar kinds of sexual fetishes.
"Melt!" (1982) by Siouxsie and the Banshees describes an intense romantic relationship in terms evocative of an S&M encounter.
"Twisted Little Sister" (1983) & "The Whip" (1984) by Savatage
"Master and Servant" (1984) by Depeche Mode
"Pleasureslave" (1988) by Manowar
"Bed of Nails" (1989) by Alice Cooper
"Pretty Tied Up" (1991) by Guns N' Roses
"Happiness in Slavery" (1992) by Nine Inch Nails takes its title and refrain from Jean Paulhan's preface to Story of O. Also 1994's "Closer" dealt with the subject, as well as the visually provocative video, which showed images of lead singer Trent Reznor tied up and blind-folded. 
"Dominated Love Slave" (1992) by Green Day, lyrics by Tré Cool, told from the point of view of a submissive masochist.
"Fetish" and "Baby Blue" (both 1999) by Joan Jett and the Blackhearts are two songs focused on this theme.
The video for "Missile" (2004) by IAMX shows Chris Corner first bound-down to a chair and then handcuffed with leather straps while his ex-girlfriend Sue Denim acts as a dominatrix.
"Ich Tu Dir Weh" (2009) by Rammstein contains fairly extreme examples of S&M, enough to get it banned from public display or sale to minors in Germany in November 2009 by the Federal Office for the Examination of Media Harmful to Young People (Bundesprüfstelle für jugendgefährdende Medien). After a hearing, the ban was lifted in 2010. Several other songs by the band have also dealt with BDSM themes, such as "Feuerräder" and "Bück Dich".
"S&M" (2011) by Rihanna from her album Loud.
British electronic singer Andi Fraggs released a single "Eroction" in 2011 which heavily featured sadomasochism in its lyrics. Limited 100 CD copies were dispatched to UK S&M clubs in a PVC sleeve.
 Madonna also embraced the S&M aesthetic and content in much of her music. Firstly, 1990's "Justify My Love" dealt with submission and sadomasochism both in the song and its controversial accompanying video. Then again in 1992 with her best-selling, widely notorious publication Sex and her coinciding album Erotica. The title track was accompanied again by another scandalous and provoking music video.

OperaLady Bumtickler's Revels'' (1872), a comic opera on the theme of flagellation written and published by John Camden Hotten.

References

Footnotes

Bibliography

See also
Fetish magazine
BDSM in culture and media
List of BDSM literature
List of dominatrices in popular culture
Marquis de Sade in popular culture

External links
 Biblio Curiosa, a bibliography of erotic and s&m literature in English and French